Huangcun station, formerly Olympic Sports Center station when planning, is an interchange station between Line 4 and Line 21 of the Guangzhou Metro, and also the terminus of Line 4. It is located at the underground outside Guangdong Olympic Stadium in Huangcun Subdistrict, Tianhe District. It started operation on 25 September 2010. Line 4 linking the Asian Games New Town outside Haibang Station with Guangdong Olympic Stadium plays a major role in carrying passengers during the Guangzhou Asian Games. The station became a transfer station with Line 21 on 20 December 2019. It is located near the Tianhe East railway station.

Station layout

Exits

Gallery

References

Railway stations in China opened in 2010
Guangzhou Metro stations in Tianhe District